The Shelbyville Grays were a minor league baseball team based in Shelbyville, Kentucky. From 1908 to 1910, the Grays played exclusively as members of the Class D level Blue Grass League, hosting home games at the Shelbyville Base Ball Park.

Baseball Hall of Fame member Casey Stengel played for the 1910 Shelbyville Grays in his first professional season.

History
Minor league baseball began in Shelbyville, Kentucky in 1908. Beginning play in the league on May 22, 1908, the "Shelbyville Grays" became charter members of the six–team Class D level Blue Grass League. The 1908 Grays placed 5th in the league final standings. With a record of 32–37 under manager Anton Kuhn, Shelbyville finished 14.0 games behind the 1st place Frankfort Statesmen. The Blue Grass League did not hold playoffs and the final records in the charter season were led by the Frankfort Statesmen (47–23), followed by the Lawrenceburg Distllers (33–35), Lexington Colts  (37–31), Richmond Pioneers (36–34), Shelbyville (32–37) and Versailles Aristocrats/Winchester Reds (22–47). The Shelbyville team moniker is also listed as the "Millers" in some references.

Continuing play in the 1909 Blue Grass League, the Shelbyville Grays finished the season in last place. Shelbyville had a final record of 39–79 to place 6th under returning manager Anton Kuhn, finishing 35.5 games behind the 1st place Winchester Hustlers.

In their final season of play, the Shelbyville franchise relocated during the 1910 season and had a legendary Hall of Fame player on their roster. On August 24, 1910, the Shelbyville franchise moved to Maysville, Kentucky, as the team finished the 1910 season playing as the Maysville Rivermen. The Shelbyville/Maysville team finished in last place in the Class D level Blue Grass League. The team finished in 6th place with a 37–89 overall record and were 42.5 games behind the 1st place Paris Bourbonites in the final standings. Anton Kuhn and Daniel Collins managed the 1910 team.

After beginning the 1910 season with the Kankakee Kays, Baseball Hall of Fame inductee Casey Stengel played for the 1910 Shelbyville Grays/Maysville Rivermen at age 19, hitting .223 for the team in 69 games and 233 at–bats.

The Maysville Rivermen continued play in the 1911 season. Shelbyville, Kentucky has not hosted another minor league team.

Shelbyville fielded a semi–professional team in 1911, playing in the "Trolley League," composed of Shelbyville, La Grange, Jeffersontown, Simpsonville, Lakeland, Ochsners, and Louisville Athletics.

The ballpark
The Shelbyville Grays played their home games at the Shelbyville Base Ball Park. The ballpark had capacity of 2,000 after a new grandstand was erected for the 1910 season.

Timeline

Year–by–year records

Notable alumni

Baseball Hall of Fame alumni
Casey Stengel (1910) Inducted, 1966

Notable alumni
Mack Allison (1909)
Ralph Comstock (1909)
Bill Cramer (1910)
Ed Glenn (1909)
Emil Huhn (1910)
George Kircher (1910)

See also
Shelbyville Grays playersShelbyville Rivermen players

References

External links
Baseball Reference

Professional baseball teams in Kentucky
Defunct baseball teams in Kentucky
Baseball teams established in 1908
Baseball teams disestablished in 1910
Blue Grass League teams
Shelbyville, Kentucky
1908 establishments in Kentucky
1910 disestablishments in Kentucky